This is a list of Grand Army of the Republic (G.A.R.) posts in Kentucky, United States.  The G.A.R. Department of Kentucky was officially organized January 17, 1883.

Over 100,000 Kentuckians, including 23,703 African Americans, served in the Union Army or the Union Navy during the Civil War, compared to over 40,000 soldiers who served in Kentucky Confederate regiments.  The number of African American soldiers from Kentucky is second only to the numbers recruited in Louisiana.

Very soon after the war, popular sentiment in the Commonwealth turned toward the "Lost Cause" ideology, largely as a result of the return of prominent former-Confederates to positions within the state and local governments.  Regardless, Kentucky had a very active G.A.R. organization and the 29th National Encampment of the G.A.R. was held in Louisville September 11–13, 1896, at a time when national membership was recorded at 357,639.

Kentucky G.A.R. Posts

Abbreviations used
 MG   = Major General
 BG   = Brigadier General
 Col  = Colonel
 Ltc  = Lieutenant Colonel
 Maj  = Major
 Cpt  = Captain
 Lt   = 1st Lieutenant
 2Lt  = 2nd Lieutenant
 Sgt  = Sergeant
 Cpl  = Corporal
 Pvt  = Private
 Bvt  = Brevet
 QM   = Quartermaster

See also

 Colored Soldiers Monument in Frankfort
 National Register of Historic Places listings in Kentucky
 List of National Historic Landmarks in Kentucky

Footnotes

External links
 The Library of Congress, List of the Department of Kentucky Posts (1-110).
 The Library of Congress, List of the Department of Kentucky Posts (111-221).

Landmarks in Kentucky
Clubhouses in Kentucky
Grand Army of the Republic Posts
Kentucky